Télesphore may refer to:

People
Jacques Telesphore Roman (1800–1848), Louisiana businessman, sugar planter and builder of Oak Alley Plantation
Télesphore Fournier PC (1823–1896), Canadian politician and jurist
Télesphore Simard (mayor) (1878–1955), Canadian politician, serving as Mayor of Quebec City
Télesphore Simard (MNA) (1863–1924), Canadian politician and member of the Legislative Assembly of Quebec for Témiscamingue
Telesphore Toppo (born 1939), Cardinal Priest and Archbishop of Ranchi in the Roman Catholic Church
Télesphore-Damien Bouchard (1881–1962), politician in Quebec, Canada
Télesphore-Eusèbe Normand, politician from Quebec, Canada

Places
Saint-Télesphore, Quebec, municipality located in Quebec, Canada

See also
Telesphorus (disambiguation)